Alsodes vittatus is a species of frog in the family Alsodidae.
It is endemic to Chile and only known from its type locality, San Ignacio de Pemehue, Malleco Province. It may be threatened by habitat loss through pine plantations and it is not known from any protected areas. It has not been seen since its discovery and searches in 1995, 1996 and 2002 failed to find it.

References 

vittatus
Amphibians of Chile
Amphibians of Patagonia
Endemic fauna of Chile
Taxonomy articles created by Polbot
Amphibians described in 1902